Chris or Christopher  Morris may refer to:

Sportspeople
 Chris Morris (footballer) (born 1963), former professional footballer who played for the Republic of Ireland
 Chris Morris (basketball) (born 1966), retired American basketball player
 Chris Morris (Canadian football) (born 1968), Canadian football offensive lineman for the Edmonton Eskimos
 Chris Morris (American football, born 1983), American football guard and center for the Tennessee Titans
 Chris Morris (American football, born 1949), American football tackle for the Cleveland Browns
 Chris Morris (cricketer) (born 1987), South African cricketer

Others
 Christopher Morris (Master of the Ordnance) (born c. 1490), military administrator during the rule of Henry VIII
 Christopher Morris (historian) (1906–1993), British historian
 Christopher Morris (news presenter) (born 1938), BBC and Sky News journalist
 Christopher Morris (accountant) (1942–2015), English accountant
 Chris Morris (author) (born 1946), science fiction and fantasy author; musician
 Christopher W. Morris (born 1949), philosophy professor
 Christopher Morris (photographer) (born 1958), American photojournalist
 Chris Morris (satirist) (born 1962), English satirical comedian, writer, and director
 Chris Morris (journalist) (born 1964), BBC World Affairs Correspondent and author of The New Turkey
 Chris Morris (music writer) (active since 1980s), Los Angeles-based music writer
 Chris Morris (activist) (born 1979), gay rights activist

See also
Christopher Cale Morris (born 1996), American ice hockey player
Christopher Norris (disambiguation)